Mainland Halifax is the remaining portion of the community of Halifax, without the Halifax Peninsula.

History
For thousands of years, and currently, Mainland Halifax has been, is, and will be on the unceded ancestral lands of the Mi'kmaq.

On 21 June 1749, the Town of Halifax was founded. Europeans began to colonize the area, and sometime between 1841-and-1842, Halifax was granted city status. Between 1841-1842--and--1969, Halifax expanded to become the entire Halifax Peninsula.

In 1969, Halifax annexed several communities from Halifax County, and they were located in what would become the area of Mainland Halifax; Armdale, Clayton Park, Fairview, Rockingham, Purcell's Cove and Spryfield.

On 1 April 1996, The City of Dartmouth, the City of Halifax, the County of Halifax, and the Town of Bedford amalgamated, and created the Halifax Regional Municipality. Subsequently, the entirety of the former City of Halifax was reestablished as the Community of Halifax and is coterminous with the former City itself. However, the new community was divided into two subsections; Mainland Halifax and Peninsular Halifax.

Currently, Mainland Halifax enjoys increased cultural, demographic, and economic growth from its great location. It hosts busy communities that make this a fantastic area within the municipality.

Geography
Mainland Halifax is portioned into two sections, Mainland North and Mainland South, divided by St. Margaret's Bay Road. The area of Mainland Halifax has a landmass of 4,301.2 hectares (43.012 km2).

Communities and neighbourhoods

Mainland North

Armdale
Bayer's Lake
Bridgeview
Clayton Park
Clayton Park West
Fairmount
Rockingham
Sherwood Heights
Wedgewood

Mainland South
Boulderwood
Cowie Hill
Green Acres
Leiblin Park
Melville Cove
Purcell's Cove
Spryfield
Williams Lake

Topography
The area lies west of the Bedford Basin and Northwest Arm and extends several kilometres inland.

Demographics
Mainland Halifax's population as of 2021 was 83,972 people, an increase of 10,662 people (over 14.5%) from 73,310 people in 2016.

The area's population density increased by 248 people per km2, from approximately 1,704 people per km2 in 2016 to approximately 1,952 people per km2 in 2021.

References

Geography of Halifax, Nova Scotia